"Sugar-Foot Rag" (or Sugarfoot Rag) is a song written by Hank Garland and Vaughn Horton (given on Red Foley's record label as George Vaughn; both were aliases for songwriter George Vaughn Horton). It was also recorded by American country music artist Jerry Reed and released in November 1979 as the lead single from his album, Texas Bound and Flyin. The song reached a peak of number 12 on the U.S. Billboard Hot Country Singles chart and number 13 on the Canadian RPM Country Tracks chart. Junior Brown covered "Sugar Foot Rag" on his 1993 album Guit with It.

Chart performance

Red Foley

Jerry Reed

References

1950 singles
Red Foley songs
1979 singles
Jerry Reed songs
1949 songs
Song recordings produced by Ray Pennington
RCA Records singles
Songs written by George Vaughn Horton